DIN 4420 refers to a series of DIN standards dedicated to working and protection scaffolds.  The standard is divided in the following parts:

 DIN 4420-1 - Working and protection scaffolds (except for ladder scaffolds) – Design and detailing
 DIN 4420-2 - Working and protection scaffolds – Ladder scaffolds
 DIN 4420-3 - Working and protection scaffolds (except for ladder scaffolds and prefabricated scaffolds) – Safety requirements and standard types
 DIN 4420-4 - Working and protection scaffolds – Prefabricated scaffolds – Materials, components, dimensions, loadbearing capacity and safety requirements

4420